Robert, Bob or Bobby Brooks may also refer to:

Business
 Robert A. Brooks (1932–2000), American telecommunications entrepreneur
 Robert H. Brooks (1937–2006), founder of Hooters of America
 Robert Brooks, chairman of English auction house Bonhams

Entertainment
 Bob Brooks (1927–2012), American film director
 Robert Green Brooks (born 1957), American music producer also known as Bobby Brooks
 Bobby Brooks (died 1990), musical agent who was killed along with Stevie Ray Vaughan
 Robert Brooks, bassist of the English band Sunhouse

Politics
 Robert Brooks (MP) (1790–1882), British Conservative Party politician, businessman and trader
 Robert Brooks (Wisconsin politician) (born 1965), American politician and businessman
 Bob Brooks (Pennsylvania politician), American politician
 Robert Brooks, British Member of Parliament for Weymouth and Melcombe Regis
 Robert Brooks, Canadian politician, known as Glenn Brooks

Sports
 Bobby Brooks (baseball) (1945–1994), American baseball player
 Bobby Brooks (defensive back) (born 1951), American football player
 Bobby Brooks (linebacker) (born 1976), American football linebacker
 Robert Brooks (born 1970), American football wide receiver
 Robert Brooks (cricketer) (born 1970), former English cricketer
 Robert Edward Brooks (born 1966), British professional wrestler, known by the ring name Robbie Brookside

Other
 Robert Preston Brooks (1881–1961), dean of the School of Commerce at the University of Georgia
 Robert Angus Brooks (1920–1976), American philologist
 Robert W. Brooks (1952–2002), American mathematician

See also
 Robert Brooke (disambiguation)
 Rob Brooks, American ice hockey team owner
 Brook Roberts (born 1983), Miss Oregon 2004
 Brooks Nunatak, Antarctic landmark, named for biologist Robert E. Brooks
 Robert Brooks Homes, Chicago housing project, part of ABLA